Teddington is a very small community on Banks Peninsula at the head of Lyttelton Harbour / Whakaraupō. It sits on the junction of the road to Gebbies Pass and the road from Purau to Christchurch.

It dates back to the early settlers of Christchurch but is now reduced to a pub and a restored working blacksmith's forge.

Tsunami 
An earthquake near Chile on 23 May 1960 caused a tsunami which crossed the Pacific to hit New Zealand.  The tsunami was funnelled up Lyttelton Harbour and flooded low-lying farmland and the Wheatsheaf Tavern in Teddington.  A similar event occurred in 2010 following an earthquake in Chile with three waves that were greater than two metres high inundating the head of the harbour around Teddington. 

An earlier tsunami occurred in 1868 following an earthquake off the coast of Peru. This caused an eight foot high wave to be funnelled up Lyttelton Harbour towards Teddington.

Demographics 

Teddington had a population of 234 at the 2018 New Zealand census, an increase of 42 people (21.9%) since the 2013 census, and an increase of 27 people (13.0%) since the 2006 census. There were 87 households. There were 117 males and 114 females, giving a sex ratio of 1.03 males per female. The median age was 46.5 years (compared with 37.4 years nationally), with 36 people (15.4%) aged under 15 years, 39 (16.7%) aged 15 to 29, 114 (48.7%) aged 30 to 64, and 42 (17.9%) aged 65 or older.

Ethnicities were 97.4% European/Pākehā, 5.1% Māori, and 2.6% Pacific peoples (totals add to more than 100% since people could identify with multiple ethnicities).

The proportion of people born overseas was 25.6%, compared with 27.1% nationally.

Although some people objected to giving their religion, 57.7% had no religion, 33.3% were Christian, 1.3% were Buddhist and 1.3% had other religions.

Of those at least 15 years old, 75 (37.9%) people had a bachelor or higher degree, and 18 (9.1%) people had no formal qualifications. The median income was $39,300, compared with $31,800 nationally. The employment status of those at least 15 was that 105 (53.0%) people were employed full-time, 33 (16.7%) were part-time, and 3 (1.5%) were unemployed.

References

Banks Peninsula
Suburbs of Christchurch
Populated places in Canterbury, New Zealand